Diplodactylus polyophthalmus, sometimes called the spotted sandplain gecko, is a gecko endemic to Australia.

References

Diplodactylus
Reptiles described in 1867
Taxa named by Albert Günther
Geckos of Australia